Xuray (also, Khuray) is a village in the Khachmaz Rayon of Azerbaijan.  The village forms part of the municipality of Seyidlikəndyeri.

References 

Populated places in Khachmaz District